Melmaruvathur is a town located in Tamil Nadu, India. The town is known for the shrine of goddess Adhi parashakthi.
Cities and towns in Viluppuram district